The Philippine Falange, the informal name for the Spanish National Assemblies of the Philippines (Juntas Nacionales Españolas), was a Philippine falangist political party that was a branch of the Spanish Falange. It was founded in 1936. The party was initially led from the late 1930s by Spanish citizen and businessman Andrés Soriano. A leadership struggle occurred between Martín Pou and Enrique Zóbel de Ayala.

The party was effectively dissolved when Soriano was quietly granted by the government Filipino citizenship. It was done to avoid a major political formation within the Philippines which was at least tacitly supportive of the Axis Powers, as Franco's Falange and subsequent Spanish Government was. Others followed suit, preventing the threat of their properties being seized by the Allied powers. Other members  collaborated with the Japanese during the occupation, excluding Soriano who joined with Manuel Quezon and the government of the Philippine Commonwealth in exile, in the United States, as well as the Spanish Filipinos who formed Commonwealth military and guerrilla forces in Negros in the Philippines.

See also
Ganap Party
Kalibapi
Makapili

References

Falangist parties
Far-right political parties
Political parties established in 1936
Defunct political parties in the Philippines
1936 establishments in the Philippines